Dimitri Mikhailovich Youzefovitch (1777–1821) was a Russian nobleman from the Poltava region. He is most notable for serving as a general in the Napoleonic Wars, especially his leadership of the force which besieged Metz in 1814. He was also commandant of Nancy after Paris's surrender.

Life
He joined the army aged 11, as a sergeant in the Preobrazhensky Life Guards Regiment. On 1 January 1795 he was promoted to captain and began active service, before transferring (still as a captain) into the Ekaterynoslavsky Cuirassier Regiment two years later.

External links

1777 births
1821 deaths
Russian generals
Russian commanders of the Napoleonic Wars